The Apprentice, later called The Celebrity Apprentice, is an American reality television show created by Mark Burnett in which candidates compete to become Donald Trump's apprentice, as determined by Trump and his boardroom associates. The series first broadcast in 2004, and twelve complete seasons have aired on NBC as of May 2012.
Each season, competitors are progressively eliminated based on their performance during an assigned task. After each task, the winning team receives a reward, while the losing team faces a boardroom showdown in order to determine which team member should be fired, and therefore eliminated from the show. Trump hires one of the finalists to be his apprentice. Starting with season 7, celebrities participated as a way to revitalize the series, with the winners donating their proceeds to charity. Trump departed the series after the fourteenth season to focus on his 2016 presidential campaign, in which actor and politician Arnold Schwarzenegger would now serve as host of the series. The fifteenth season, featuring Schwarzenegger was branded as The New Celebrity Apprentice.

As of season 14, 229 candidates have competed, one of whom has competed three times—Omarosa Manigault-Stallworth competed in both season 1, season 7, and season 13. The youngest competitors include Jessie Connors and Chris Shelton, who appeared on the show at age 21. At age 75, Joan Rivers of season 8 was the oldest candidate to both appear on the show and win the competition. There have been six instances in which a candidate left The Apprentice for reasons other than being eliminated by Trump. Overcome by stress, Verna Felton of season 3 "just packed up and walked out". Michelle Sorro of season 6 quit after determining that the competition was "too much" and "not worth it". Actor Vincent Pastore of season 7 resigned due to a conflict with Piers Morgan. Olympic sprinter Michael Johnson of season 9 quit due to a personal family situation. During season 11, baseball player Jose Canseco quit due to his father's illness and NeNe Leakes left due to a conflict with Star Jones. The fifteen winners of the show, in chronological order, are Bill Rancic, Kelly Perdew, Kendra Todd, Randal Pinkett, Sean Yazbeck, Stefanie Schaeffer, Piers Morgan, Joan Rivers, Bret Michaels, Brandy Kuentzel, John Rich, Arsenio Hall, Trace Adkins (the first All-Star Celebrity Apprentice), Leeza Gibbons, and Matt Iseman.

Candidates

 Candidate's team at the start of the season.
 Candidate's age at the start of the season.
 Four season-4 candidates were fired simultaneously and therefore display the same result.
 Two season-5 candidates were fired simultaneously and therefore display the same result.

References

General
 
 
 
  Note: User should click on the "Candidates" link for details.
  Note: User should click on the "Candidates" link for details.
 
 
 
 
 
  Note: User should click on the "Candidates" link for details.

Specific

External links

NBC.com: The Apprentice

Lists of 21st-century people
Lists of reality show participants
The Apprentice (franchise) contestants
Candidates